Xiaoyu Weng is a Chinese curator, writer, editor and educator in the area of contemporary art.

Career
Born in Shanghai, Xiaoyu Weng holds a BA in Art History from the Central Academy of Fine Arts in Beijing and a MA in Curatorial Practice from the California College of the Arts in San Francisco (2007-2008). She was the inaugural curatorial fellow at Wattis Institute for Contemporary Arts at the California College of the Arts (2008-2009) and program director of the Asian Contemporary Art Consortium in San Francisco.

Early in her career, Weng found she preferred talking with artists more than art history. In 2010, Weng was appointed founding director of Asia Programs at the Kadist Art Foundation's Asia Programmes for Paris and San Francisco, where she oversaw artist residencies, built the contemporary Asian art collection, and launched the Kadist Curatorial Collaboration, which organizes exhibitions designed to encourage cultural exchange. Her exhibitions and programs at the Kadish often involved artist residencies and work in contemporary mediums, such as video installations, "digital literature" or installation and photography. She organized shows like Ho Tzu Nyen: The Cloud of Unknowing (2011), Ming Wong: Making Chinatown (2012), Young Hae Chang Heavy Industries: Pacific Limm (2013), Robert Zhao Renhui: Flies Prefer Yellow (2014).  She also participated in shows for other institutions such as the Invisible Hand: Curating as Gesture, the second CAFAM International Biennial in 2014 at the Central Academy of Fine Arts Museum, Beijing for which she was one of the collaborators. She was also a co-curator of the exhibition Landscape: the virtual, the actual, the possible? (the show’s title refers to Félix Guattari's "four ontological functors") for the Guangdong Times Museum in Guangzhou and the Yerba Buena Center for the Arts in San Francisco in 2014.

In 2015, she was appointed The Robert H.N. Ho Family Foundation Associate Curator at The Solomon R. Guggenheim Museum, New York where she co-curated the exhibitions Tales of Our Time (2016), which commissioned new works by nine artists born in mainland China, Hong Kong, or Taiwan and One Hand Clapping (2018), featuring artworks by five artists and artist collectives from artists born in Greater China, including Cao Fei and Samson Young. She was an integral part of the curatorial team at the Guggenheim for more than five years.

In 2016, she curated Soft Crash, a homage to J. G. Ballard, held at Galleria d’Arte Moderna e Contemporanea di Bergamo, Italy. From 2018 to 2019, Weng served as the Curator of the 5th Ural Industrial Biennial of Contemporary Art held in Yekaterinburg, Russia, transforming a former military factory and an abandoned theater into contemporary art spaces. In 2019, she curated Neither Black / Red / Yellow Nor Woman about three women who search for their voices as artists, held at the Times Art Center Berlin, Germany and in 2021, Miriam Cahn and Claudia Martínez Garay: Ten Thousand Things in which both artists evoked in their work shared experiences as women and as witnesses to their generations, held at the Sifang Art Museum, Nanjing, China. 

In March 2021, she began a new appointment to the Art Gallery of Ontario in Toronto as the lead curator of modern and contemporary art. That April her exhibition Christian Nyampeta: Sometimes It Was Beautiful opened in the rotunda of the Guggenheim Museum, involving film, audio, videos, and drawings.

Her curatorial practice has a wide range of interests, among them identity, as well as the intersection of art and technology and globalism in response to a national framework. She also has had a diverse teaching practice and has taught at New York University, CCS Bard College, and the School of Visual Arts, New York.

Publications
Weng has contributed essays on contemporary art for books such as Six Lines of Flight: Shifting Geographies in Contemporary Art  published in association with University of California Press on the occasion of the exhibition of the same name, held at the San Francisco Museum of Modern Art (2012). She has also written for numerous periodicals, among them Artforum, and is the author or co-author of catalogue essays such as Tales of Our Time (2016) and One Hand Clapping (2018). She is Guest Editor of Heichi Magazine, a bi-lingual digital forum for visual culture exchange in the Chinese-speaking world and internationally.

Honours
 Asian Cultural Council’s Starr Foundation Fellowship (2007-2009);  
 Artforum Critical Writing Award, for the essay "Working with Archive" (2011);
 Premio Lorenzo Bonald per L’Arte Enterprize for international curators (2015);
 Visionary Award, presented by Art in General, New York, to highlight work that champions the transformative power of art and that nurtures and supports diverse artistic talents (2017);
 Exhibition of the Year Award, 5th Ural Industrial Biennial of Contemporary Art held in Yekaterinburg, Russia, presented by The Art Newspaper Russia (2019)

References

1985 births
Living people
Chinese art curators
American art curators
Chinese women curators
Central Academy of Fine Arts alumni
California College of the Arts alumni